The following is a list of presidents of the Landtag of the Free People's State of Württemberg.

Sources
Raberg, Frank: Biographische Handbuch der württembergischen Landtagsabgeordneten 1815-1933, Kohlhammer Verlag Stuttgart 2001 

Political history of Germany
Lists of legislative speakers in Germany